Baswapur is a village in Siddipet district of Telangana, India. It falls under Jagadevpur mandal.

 It belongs to Telangana region
 It is located 96 KM towards East from Sangareddi
 10 KM from Jagdevpur
 73 KM from State capital Hyderabad Baswapur Pin code is 502301 and postal head office is Kuknoorpally
 Munigadapa (3 KM), Wattipalle (3 KM), Chatlapalle (3 KM), Chinna Kistapur (4 KM), Rayavaram (7 KM) are the nearby Villages to Baswapur
 Baswapur is surrounded by Kondapak Mandal towards North, Gajwel Mandal towards west, Rajapet Mandal towards South, Cheriyal Mandal towards East
 Siddipet, Jangaon, Bhongir, Sircilla are the nearby Cities to Baswapur
 This Place is in the border of the Medak District and Nalgonda District
 Nalgonda District Rajapet is South towards this place
 Demographics of Baswapur Telugu is the Local Language here
 Total population of Baswapur is 1392. Male are 710 and Female are 682 living in 284 houses.
 Total area of Baswapur is 308 hectares.

References

 Baswapur location

Villages in Siddipet district